Monte Carlo is a city in Santa Catarina, in the Southern Region of Brazil. It is part of the metropolitan region of the city of Fraiburgo.

References

Municipalities in Santa Catarina (state)